is a railway station on the Chitose Line in Chitose, Hokkaido, Japan, operated by Hokkaido Railway Company (JR Hokkaido).

Lines
Chitose Station is served by the Chitose Line. The station is numbered "H13".

Station layout
The station consists of two elevated island platforms serving four tracks. The station has automated ticket machines, automated turnstiles which accept the Kitaca farecard, and a "Midori no Madoguchi" staffed ticket office.

Platforms

Adjacent stations

Surrounding area

 Chitose Post office
 Chitose Police station
 Chitose city office
 Chitose high school

See also
 List of railway stations in Japan

References

Railway stations in Hokkaido Prefecture
Railway stations in Japan opened in 1926
Stations of Hokkaido Railway Company
Chitose, Hokkaido